Spirit Lake is a lake in the southern Yukon about 70 km south of Whitehorse. The lake is situated just off the Klondike Highway. The lake has emerald green colours. The distinct crater-like holes on the lake bottom were shaped by glaciers which retreated thousands of years ago.

See also 
List of lakes of Yukon

References 

Lakes of Yukon